Platanthera blephariglottis, commonly known as the white fringed orchid or white-fringed orchis, is a species of orchid of the genus Platanthera. It is considered to be an endangered species in Connecticut and Ohio, a threatened species in Florida, Maryland and Rhode Island, exploitably vulnerable in New York, and susceptible to be threatened in Québec.

Platanthera is a Greek word that means "flat" and "flower". For this use it means "wide or flat anthered". Blephariglottis is from  blepharis which means "eyelash" or "fringed" and glottis for "tongue."

Description 
Flowering from late spring until summer, Platanthera blephariglottis is an 8 to 110 centimeters (3 to 43 inches) tall plant that can be found growing in bogs and on the moist banks of lakes and rivers on the eastern side of North America.

Stem and leaves At least 2 and often several spreading to ascending leaves scattered along the stem. Leaf shapes from linear-lanceolate, ovate-lanceolate and elliptic-lanceolate.

Flowers Dense to lax spikes of showy white flowers.  Lateral sepals bent downward and outward more than 90 degrees. Petals are near entire fringed and the shape is linear and narrows toward the point of attachment.

Distribution 
Often found growing in sphagnum and other acidic moss, in open wet areas in black spruce and/or tamarack bogs or on the boggy shores of lakes and in open wet meadows.
Native
Nearctic
Eastern Canada: Ontario, Quebec
Northeastern United States: Connecticut, Maine, Massachusetts, Michigan, New Hampshire, New Jersey, New York, Ohio, Pennsylvania, Rhode Island, Vermont
North-Central United States: Illinois, Missouri, Wisconsin
Southeastern United States: Alabama, Delaware, Florida, Georgia, Louisiana, Maryland, North Carolina, South Carolina, Virginia
South-Central United States: Texas
Sources: NRCS, WSH

References

External links

Further reading 
 Niering, W., Olmstead, N., National Audubon Society Guide to North American Wildflowers, Eastern Region,1995, plate 151 and page 655, 

blephariglottis
Orchids of Canada
Orchids of the United States
Flora of the Eastern United States
Plants described in 1805